The 2020 Red Bull Ring FIA Formula 3 round was a motor racing event held on 4 and 5 July 2020 at the Red Bull Ring in Austria. It is the first round of the 2020 FIA Formula 3 Championship, and ran in support of the 2020 Austrian Grand Prix.

Entries 
17 drivers made their full-time FIA Formula 3 Championship debut, with only Jenzer driver Federico Malvestiti having had experience in the category before. The other rookies were Formula Renault Eurocup champion Oscar Piastri and Formula Regional European champion Frederik Vesti at Prema Racing, Italian F4 champion Dennis Hauger at Hitech Grand Prix, ADAC F4 Championship winner Théo Pourchaire and Aleksandr Smolyar at ART Grand Prix, Olli Caldwell at Trident, Enzo Fittipaldi and Jack Doohan at HWA Racelab, Lukas Dunner at MP Motorsport, Calan Williams and F4 UAE champion Matteo Nannini, Roman Staněk, David Schumacher and 2020 Toyota Racing Series winner Igor Fraga at Charouz, BRDC F3 champion Clément Novalak, Enaam Ahmed and Cameron Das at Carlin Buzz Racing, and Sophia Flörsch at Campos Racing. Logan Sargeant switched from Carlin to Prema, Max Fewtrell and Liam Lawson moved to Hitech from ART Grand Prix and MP Motorsport respectively, Sebastián Fernández went from Campos to ART, meanwhile Lirim Zendeli and David Beckmann came to Trident from Charouz and ART respectively, and Bent Viscaal made a move to MP Motorsport from HWA. The other drivers, namely Jake Hughes (HWA), Richard Verschoor (MP), Alex Peroni and Alessio Deledda (both Campos) returned to their previous year's team respectively.

Classification

Qualifying

Feature Race

Sprint Race

Standings after the event

Drivers' Championship standings

Teams' Championship standings

 Note: Only the top five positions are included for both sets of standings.

See also
2020 Austrian Grand Prix
2020 Red Bull Ring FIA Formula 2 Round

References

External links
Official website

|- style="text-align:center"
|width="35%"|Previous race:
|width="30%"|FIA Formula 3 Championship2020 season
|width="40%"|Next race:

Spielberg
Spielberg
Auto races in Austria